Rohnerville Airport  is a public airport located  southeast of Fortuna in Humboldt County, California. It is owned by the County of Humboldt.

Although most U.S. airports use the same three-letter location identifier for the FAA and IATA, Rohnerville Airport is assigned FOT by the FAA but has no designation from the IATA (which assigned FOT to Forster, New South Wales, Australia).

Facilities and aircraft 

For the year ending in October 2004, the airport had 27,500 aircraft operations, an average of 75 per day, all of which were general aviation. There were 36 aircraft based at this airport: 86% single engine, 11% multi-engine and 3% helicopters.

Cal Fire has an air base with an OV-10 Bronco and a S-2T airtanker based there.

Nearby airports
 Arcata-Eureka Airport
 Eureka Municipal Airport
 Kneeland Airport
 Murray Field

References

External links

Live Webcams and AWOS information at Rohnerville Airport

Airports in Humboldt County, California